The Federal University of Western Pará (UFOPA) is a public university in the state of Pará, in northern Brazil.

UFOPA was founded in 1970 as Núcleo de Educação em Santarém (NES), and was renamed UFOPA in 2009. It has an annual budget of 90 million real, and has over 400 faculty and over 10,000 students.

References

External links
 

Educational institutions established in 1970
Universities and colleges in Pará
1970 establishments in Brazil
Para